The Type 59 Durjoy is a highly modernized version of the Chinese Type 59 tank for the Bangladesh Army. The Bangladesh Army's old Type 59 tanks were upgraded similarly to Type 59G standard at 902 Central Workshop of the Bangladesh Machine Tools Factory with Chinese assistance. Bangladesh Army renamed the tank as Durjoy.

History
Bangladesh is an active delta with hundreds of rivers and swamps, so its army needs armoured vehicles with limited weight but good protection, firepower and speed. Between the 1980s and the early 2000s, the army had hundreds of Type 59 tanks which stayed in service until 2015. The Bangladesh Army decided to upgrade all the remaining functional tanks because the rebuilding process of a tank costs one third of buying a new one. During this process only the hull of the original tank is used and all the other aspects are upgraded.  BMTF upgraded 174 type 59 tanks to Durjoy standard.

Description
The tank weighs  package.

The Durjoy uses a  diesel engine and has a power to weight ratio of 17.4 hp per tonnes. The maximum speed of the vehicle varies: in fact the tank can run at  max. It is equipped with rubber padded tracks to navigate softer soils and swamps. The tank has five road wheels on each side with a prominent gap between the first and second road wheel. The track is driven by a drive sprocket at the rear, with an idler at the front. It is notable that there are no return rollers. The suspension is a torsion bar system. The engine exhaust is on the left fender.

The Durjoy tanks require a crew of 4 people which includes commander, driver, gunner and loader. Unlike the basic Type 59, the Durjoy has an air conditioning system to increase crew comfort and complete NBC protection.

Protection

The primary protection system of the tank is made of a layer of thick steel modular composite armour. To increase protection against APFSDS, HEAT and ATGM rounds, there is Chinese 3rd generation explosive reactive armour on the tank's front and turret.  Besides, there is cage armour at the back of the turret to increase the protection level. Smoke grenade launchers are fitted to each side of the turret. A collective fire suppression system is added to increase the crew survivability rate. The tanks are equipped with a laser warning receiver to give a warning when it's targeted by an enemy laser range-finder or laser designator.

Armaments

The Durjoy tank has a 125 mm smoothbore gun which is the tank's primary weapon. The gun has a dual-axis gun stabilizer which enables the tank to fire at a target while the tank is moving. This gun is capable of firing APFSDS ,  HEAT and HE rounds as well as anti-tank guided missiles. The APFSDS used by Durjoy tank can penetrate 500mm RHA armor as far as 2 km away.

As a secondary armament, it has a 12.7 mm W85 heavy machine gun with 3000 rounds and a 7.62 mm Type 86 coaxial machine gun with 550-600 rounds. The 12.7 mm machine gun can be used in an anti-aircraft role too. It also has 81mm smoke grenades.

Electronics
The Durjoy uses a modern fire-control system comparable to the fourth generation Chinese tanks. Its ballistic computer has an integrated thermal imaging system and laser designator. It also has an independent commander's sight.

The Durjoy has a night vision system and Global Positioning System (GPS) navigation. Unlike a basic Type 59 tank, these tanks have a combat data link which gives them better situational awareness. This tank uses XDZ-1 SATCOM and VRC-2000L radio contact systems for communication.

Operators

See also

Comparable tanks
Al-Zarrar
CM-11
CM-12
Leonardo M60A3 SLEP
Leopard C2 (/)
M-55S
M60 Phoenix (/)
M60-2000 Main Battle Tank (/)
M60 Sabra (/)
Magach
Ramses II MBT
Sho't
TR-85M1
Type 72Z
Mobarez tank
Olifant Mk.II
PT-91 Twardy
Raytheon M60A3 SLEP
RTA M60 MBT (/)
T-54M 
T-55AGM
T-72M4CZ
Tanque Argentino Mediano (/)
Tifon 2a (/)
Zulfiqar
Related developments
Type 59
T-54/T-55
Type 69II G
Related lists
T-54/T-55 operators and variants
Equipment of the Bangladesh Army

References

Post–Cold War main battle tanks
Main battle tanks of Bangladesh
Military vehicles introduced in the 2010s
Bangladesh–China relations